Satyananda Mishra (born 1949), is the former Chief Information Commissioner of India. He is the IAS officer of 1973 batch. Satyananda Mishra has been appointed Chairman of the Multi-Commodity Exchange of India Ltd(MCX).

References 

Indian Administrative Service officers
1949 births
Living people